Sinkankasite, mineral formula: , was named after John Sinkankas (1915–2002), noted author and mineral collector, Scripps Institute of Oceanography. It is triclinic; as colorless, bladed to prismatic crystals up to 4 mm in length, often as divergent, radial aggregates and as pseudomorphs after triphlyte crystals; occurs in the Barker pegmatite (formerly Ferguson pegmatite), east of Keystone, South Dakota, and in the Palermo pegmatite, North Groton, New Hampshire.

References

Phosphate minerals
Triclinic minerals
Minerals in space group 2